The WLs75 is a small narrow gauge diesel locomotive built in Poland, at the ZNTK in Poznań. It was used mostly on industrial railways.

History 
The locomotive's design was started at the CBKPTK (Central Design Bureau of Railway Stock Industry) in Poznań. The design was finally made in 1961 by the ZNTK Poznań (Railway Stock Repair Works). It was powered by 75 hp diesel engine and had a mechanical transmission, driving two axles by cranks and connecting rods. 

WLs75s were first built in 1965. (WLs stood for Wąskotorowa - narrow-gauge, lokomotywa - locomotive, spalinowa - internal combustion engine). In total, 86 were built with the last shipped in 1975.

The locomotives were only used in Poland. It was hoped thatthey would be acquired by Polish State Railways (PKP), but the railways found them under-powered. As a result, they were manufactured for the industry, mostly sugar works, smelters and steelworks. Two were used by the Polish Army. Production was relatively low, because most buyers preferred the cheaper 50 hp 2WLs50 locomotives.

References

0-4-0 locomotives
Diesel locomotives of Poland
750 mm gauge locomotives
785 mm gauge locomotives
900 mm gauge locomotives
Railway locomotives introduced in 1965